Fimbristylis leucocolea is a sedge of the family Cyperaceae that is native to Australia.

It blooms between February and June and produces green-brown flowers.

In Western Australia it is found on rocky sandstone hills in the Kimberley region where it grows in skeletal red sandy-clay soils.

References

Plants described in 1878
Flora of Western Australia
leucocolea
Taxa named by George Bentham